Variable dorid is a common name for several species of nudibranchs and may refer to:

Aphelodoris brunnea, native to Australia
Aphelodoris varia, native to South Africa

Dorididae